Frank Melong (September 15, 1925 – August 19, 1967) was a Canadian professional hockey player who played for the Indianapolis Capitals, New Haven Eagles, St. Louis Flyers, Houston Huskies, and Omaha Knights in the American Hockey League and United States Hockey League.

External links
 

1925 births
1967 deaths
Canadian ice hockey defencemen